The Vancouver anti-Chinese riots of 1886, sometimes called the Winter Riots because of the time of year they took place, were prompted by the engagement of cheap Chinese labour by the Canadian Pacific Railway to clear Vancouver's West End of large Douglas fir trees and stumps, passing over the thousands of unemployed men from the rest of Canada who had arrived looking for work.

See also
Chinese head tax in Canada
Royal Commission on Chinese Immigration (1885)
Chinese Immigration Act of 1885
Chinese Immigration Act, 1923
Anti-Oriental riots (Vancouver)

Further reading
 
 
 

1886 in British Columbia
1886 riots
Race riots in Canada
History of Vancouver
Accidents and incidents involving Canadian Pacific Railway
Anti-Chinese activities in Canada
January 1886 events
Anti-Chinese violence in North America
Chinese-Canadian culture in Vancouver